Miss Heritage 2014, was the 2nd edition of the Miss Heritage pageant. Shequera Grace King of the Bahamas crowned her successor Odessa Mae Tadaya of the Philippines at the end of this event held at Silver Star Hotel and Casino in Johannesburg South Africa. 42 countries and territories participated in the event.

Results

Continental Queens

Contestants

Crowned Queens at  national pageants

Miss Heritage Rwanda  Marlene Mutoniwase was crowned on the 20th of February at the Miss Rwanda Pageant .

Miss Heritage Swaziland Phumzile Thwala was crowned in September 2013.

Miss Heritage Philippines Odessa Mae Tadaya was crowned as the official delegate for Philippines for Miss Heritage 2014.

Miss Heritage India Avneet Kaur Arora was crowned as the official delegate of India for Miss Heritage 2014.

Heritage Championship events

Ludo-diversity Queen
Ludo Diversity means  diversity in games, of all sorts, physical and non physical. Contestants engage into traditional games, from different countries. Traditional games are part of intangible heritage and a symbol of the cultural diversity in the world. They are medium to project and show the great values of solidarity, diversity, inclusiveness and cultural awareness.

Game 1- Iintonga is a South African ancient Indigenous Game.

This game is an ancient game that has been practiced for many centuries in South AfricaTwo fighters go into a ring. Each contestant will be having two plastic form rubber sticks, the attack and the defense stick. The referee blows a whistle to start the game and the fighters try to hit their opponent with their stick, while defending themselves with the defense stick. Points are given due to number of blows that hit the fighter’s body. A referee controls the match and a timekeeper controls the rounds in each bout. A bout consists of three rounds of one minute each.

Heritage Night of the Gifted

"Event not held

Heritage Cuisine Queen

This competition is a  Gift performance show, ie Talent in layman’s terms. It is  based on gifts/talents that are Traditional, Heritage themed depending per country. So each contestant shows off her country’s culture through the heritage performance. Contestants shall also be put into two groups’ whereby they are required to produce a 5 minute Drama /Play per group which Portrays World Heritage related Issues.

Winner
   - Joyce Jansen

1st runner up
   -Avneet Kaur Arora

2nd runner up
   -Jennifer Hunt

References

2014 beauty pageants
2014 in South Africa
December 2014 events in South Africa
2010s in Johannesburg 
Entertainment events in South Africa